Antonius Johannes Geesink (6 April 1934 – 27 August 2010) was a Dutch 10th dan judoka. He was the first non-Japanese judoka to win gold at the World Judo Championship, a feat he accomplished in 1961 and 1965. He was also an Olympic Champion, having won gold at the 1964 Summer Olympics in Japan, and won a record 21 European Judo Championships during his career.

Judo career

Geesink took up judo aged 14 and by 17 started competing internationally, winning a silver medal in 1951. The following year, he won his first European title. Through to 1967, twenty more European titles followed.

At the 1956 World Championships, Geesink was eliminated in the semi-finals against Yoshihiko Yoshimatsu. At the 1961 World Championships, Geesink, then 5th dan, became World Champion in the open class, defeating the Japanese champion Koji Sone. Japanese judokas had won all the World Championship titles contested up to that point.

Judo debuted as an official sport at the 1964 Summer Olympics, which were held in the sport's home country, Japan. Although Japan dominated three of the four weight divisions (light, middle and heavy), Anton Geesink won the final of the open weight division, defeating Akio Kaminaga in front of his home crowd.

After winning the 1965 World Championships and a last European title in 1967, Geesink quit competitive judo.

Anton Geesink was one of the few 10th Dan grade judoka (jūdan) recognized by the IJF but not by Kodokan at that rank. Promotions from 6th to 10th Dan are awarded for services to the sport of judo. In 2010 there are three living 10th dan grade judoka (jūdan) recognized by Kodokan: Toshiro Daigo, Ichiro Abe and Yoshimi Osawa. The Kodokan has not awarded the 10th Dan to anybody outside Japan.

Professional wrestling career
In October 1973, All Japan Pro Wrestling owner Giant Baba recruited Anton Geesink to join AJPW. Baba sent him to Amarillo, TX and Dory Funk Jr. and Terry Funk trained him for a month. He worked for All Japan from 1973 to 1978, as a popular part-timer.

Geesink's notable professional wrestling opponents included Bruno Sammartino, Gorilla Monsoon, Dick Murdoch, Dory Funk Jr., Bobby Duncum, Bob Remus (Sgt. Slaughter), Don Leo Jonathan, and Jumbo Tsuruta.

Films and publications

Geesink made his acting debut in 1962, playing a detective in the Dutch film Rififi in Amsterdam. In 1965 he starred as Samson in the Italian historical film Gideon and Samson: Great Leaders of the Bible, and in the 1970s-1980s took part in two Dutch TV series. In the 1960s he published several books on judo in Dutch and English.

International Olympic Committee work
In 1987, Geesink became a member of the board of the Dutch National Olympic Committee, and a member of the International Olympic Committee (IOC).

Geesink was among the IOC members suspected of accepting bribes during the scandal surrounding the election of Salt Lake City as the host of the 2002 Winter Olympics. Geesink's name was cleared by the IOC which nevertheless issued him a warning for the appearance of a conflict of interest which could have damaged the reputation of the IOC. Geesink continued working for IOC until his death in 2010.

Personal life and death

Geesink was born and raised in Utrecht. His family was poor and he started work as a builder aged 12. He died in 2010 aged 76 in the town of his birth. He was survived by Jans Geesink, his wife of more than 50 years; his daughters Willy and Leni; and son Anton jr. .

Honours
Geesink was chosen as the Dutch Sportsman of the Year in 1957, 1961, 1964 and 1965. He was awarded the Order of the Sacred Treasure by the Japanese government in 1997.

His home town of Utrecht has a street named after him — which is the street he lived on for some time up until his death in August 2010. On 29 January 2000, he was awarded an honorary doctorate by Kokushikan University, a Japanese university known for its sport education and of which four alumni are Olympic gold medalists in judo, with the following praise:

ヘーシンク氏は、一九六四年東京オリンピックにおいて、柔道無差別級で外国人選手として初めて金メダルを獲得し、その後、武道精神をもって国際平和に貢献するとともにオランダ・日本両国民の文化交流・友好関係の促進に努め、また柔道を教育学や生体学的角度から研究し、その普及発展のために尽力された。
武道の精神を重視する本大学は、柔道の国際的普及における同氏の功績を讃え、国士舘大学名誉博士の学位を贈呈した。

At the 1964 Tokyo Olympics, Mr. Geesink won the gold medal in the open class as the first non-Japanese. Since then, with the spirit of budō, he has contributed to the international peace and promoted the cultural exchange and friendship between the people of the Netherlands and of Japan. Furthermore, he explored judo in light of education and somatology and has been devoted to its diffusion and development. To honor his contribution to the worldwide diffusion of judo, this university, as a body which prizes the spirit of budō, awarded him an honorary doctorate of Kokushikan University.

References

External links

 
 Videos of Anton Geesink (judovision.org)
 Online access to the inventory of the archives of Geesink (The Utrecht Archives)

1934 births
2010 deaths
Dutch male judoka
International Olympic Committee members
Judoka at the 1964 Summer Olympics
Medalists at the 1964 Summer Olympics
Olympic gold medalists for the Netherlands
Olympic judoka of the Netherlands
Olympic medalists in judo
Recipients of the Order of the Sacred Treasure
Sportspeople from Utrecht (city)
World judo champions
Dutch male professional wrestlers
Expatriate professional wrestlers in Japan
20th-century Dutch people